Fuad Gbolahan Salami (born 15 April 1991) is a Nigerian footballer who plays as forward for Iraqi club Al-Nasiriya.

Club career
He started with Sunshine Stars F.C. before moving to Ibadan-based Shooting Stars F.C.
In 2010, he was suspended by the league for using threatening language after scoring in a league game against his old team.
He joined Warri Wolves ahead of the 2014 season, and with ten games left was second in scoring with 13 league goals.

Red Star Belgrade

In January 2015, Salami transferred to Serbian side Red Star Belgrade by signing a loan deal for remainder of the season, with an option for permanent deal.
He returned to Warri less than two months later when Red Star was having financial problems.

Irtysh Pavlodar
On 25 January 2018 Salami signed for Irtysh Pavlodar. On 9 August 2018, Salami left Irtysh Pavlodar by mutual consent.

International career
Salami was part of the Nigeria national under-20 football team at the 2009 African Youth Championship. Then, he was part of the Nigeria national under-23 football team during their failed attempt to qualify for the 2012 London Olympics.
In January 2014, coach Stephen Keshi, invited him to be a part of the Nigeria national football team for the 2014 African Nations Championship. He scored the only goal for the Home-based Eagles in their opening 2–1 loss to Mali.

He was called into the squad for the 2015 Africa Cup of Nations qualification and scored a late goal as a substitute against Congo, but Nigeria lost 3–2 at home. His form earned him a start in the next game away to South Africa.

International goals
Scores and results list Nigeria's goal tally first.

Honours

Club
Warri Wolves: Nigerian Premier Football League: runners-up 2014/2015

Individual
Nigerian Premier League Top Scorer (1): 2014-2015

References

Living people
1991 births
Association football forwards
Nigerian footballers
Nigeria international footballers
Nigeria under-20 international footballers
Shooting Stars S.C. players
Sunshine Stars F.C. players
Warri Wolves F.C. players
Red Star Belgrade footballers
Kuopion Palloseura players
FC Irtysh Pavlodar players
Nigerian expatriate footballers
Expatriate footballers in Serbia
Expatriate footballers in Finland
Expatriate footballers in Kazakhstan
Nigerian expatriate sportspeople in Saudi Arabia
Expatriate footballers in Saudi Arabia
Al-Qaisumah FC players
Najran SC players
Ohod Club players
Saudi First Division League players
Veikkausliiga players
Kazakhstan Premier League players
Sportspeople from Lagos
Nigeria A' international footballers
2014 African Nations Championship players
Nigerian expatriate sportspeople in Finland
Nigerian expatriate sportspeople in Kazakhstan
Nigerian expatriate sportspeople in Serbia